is a passenger railway station in the city of Tomioka, Gunma, Japan, operated by the private railway operator Jōshin Dentetsu.

Lines

Station layout
The station consists of a single island platform connected to the station building by a level crossing.

Platforms

Adjacent stations

History
Nanjai Station opened on 2 July 1897.

Surrounding area
Nanjai Post Office

See also
 List of railway stations in Japan

External links

 Jōshin Dentetsu 
  Burari-Gunma 

Railway stations in Gunma Prefecture
Railway stations in Japan opened in 1897
Tomioka, Gunma